Congregation Beth Jacob (בית יעקב in Hebrew) is a Conservative Jewish synagogue located in Galveston, Texas. The present synagogue was built by Austrian, Russian and Hungarian immigrants in 1931.

The congregation is small, but still very active in the Galveston Community. It is currently led Rabbi Todd Doctor.  Rabbi Jimmy Kessler, of Galveston's reform synagogue Congregation B'nai Israel, previously assisted the congregation with religious functions such as marriages and funerals.

History 

Beth Jacob's roots date back to 1888 when a group of orthodox Russian Jews came together to form the Hebrew Orthodox Benevolent Association. Around the same time a group of Orthodox Jews from the Austro-Hungarian Empire immigrated to Galveston and began looking for a synagogue to join.  Since the only Orthodox synagogue in Galveston at the time followed Russian tradition, they chose to form their own synagogue organization, the Young Men's Hebrew Association.

During the early part of the 20th century there was a great influx of Jews from Russia and eastern Europe under the Galveston Movement program. Therefore, in an effort to unite the growing Orthodox community, on February 15, 1931, the two Orthodox congregations voted to merge and form Congregation Beth Jacob. Despite being in the middle of the Great Depression, Rabbi Louis Feigon and members raised funds to build a new synagogue on the site of the old Hebrew Orthodox Benevolent Association.

The congregation continued to grow and by the early 1960s it became evident new buildings were needed for religious, educational and social facilities. In 1965 a new wing was built that included a 242-seat sanctuary, a large social hall, a library and more school rooms for the expanded Sunday, Hebrew and Hebrew high schools.

In the 1970s the congregation joined the United Synagogue of Conservative Judaism.

See also 
 Galveston Movement
 Galveston, Texas
 Jewish Texan
 History of the Jews in Galveston, Texas

References

External links
Congregation Beth Jacob
Texas Jewish Historical Society
Jewish Federation of Greater Houston
Torah transfer to enrich new synagogue
Rituals bring synagogue back to life

Ashkenazi Jewish culture in Texas
Conservative synagogues in Texas
Buildings and structures in Galveston, Texas
Jews and Judaism in Galveston, Texas
Religious organizations established in 1888
1888 establishments in Texas
Austrian-American culture in Texas
Austrian-Jewish culture in the United States
Hungarian-Jewish culture in the United States
Russian-Jewish culture in the United States
Ukrainian-Jewish culture in the United States
Synagogues completed in 1931
1931 establishments in Texas
Synagogues completed in 1965
1965 establishments in Texas